FC Chungju is a South Korean football club based in the city of Chungju. The club is a member of the K4 League, a semi-professional league and the fourth tier of football in South Korea.

Current squad

Season-by-season records

See also
 List of football clubs in South Korea

References

K4 League clubs
K3 League (2007–2019) clubs
Sport in North Chungcheong Province
Chungju
Association football clubs established in 2017
Association football clubs established in 2023
2017 establishments in South Korea
2023 establishments in South Korea